The 1994–95 Slovenian Second League season started on 14 August 1994 and ended on 4 June 1995. Each team played a total of 30 matches. Vevče was replaced by Radeče before the start of the season.

League standing

Relegation play-offs

Šentjur won 5–3 on aggregate.

2–2 on aggregate. Domžale won on away goals.

See also
1994–95 Slovenian PrvaLiga
1994–95 Slovenian Third League

References

External links
Football Association of Slovenia 

Slovenian Second League seasons
2
Slovenia